Lewis Oglethorpe (22 February 1681 – 30 October 1704) was an English Member of Parliament and soldier.

He was educated at Middle Temple and Corpus Christi College, Oxford.

Oglethorpe entered parliament in 1702 as member for Haslemere, for which his father Sir Theophilus Oglethorpe had previously been MP and which was later represented by his brothers Theophilus, junior and James.

He was wounded at the Battle of Schellenberg in July 1704, and died as a result of his injuries three months later.

|-

References

www.godalming-museum.org.uk

1681 births
1704 deaths
Alumni of Corpus Christi College, Oxford
English MPs 1702–1705
18th-century soldiers
English army officers
British military personnel of the War of the Spanish Succession